Peter James Rundle (born 31 October 1962) is an Australian politician. He has been a Nationals member of the Western Australian Legislative Assembly since the 2017 state election, representing Roe.

Rundle was a farmer at Katanning before entering politics. He served as chair of the Great Southern Development Commission in 2009, and as a member of the WA Regional Development Trust from 2011.

On 30 January 2023, Rundle was elected as deputy party leader and deputy leader of the opposition.

References

1962 births
Living people
National Party of Australia members of the Parliament of Western Australia
Members of the Western Australian Legislative Assembly
21st-century Australian politicians